Velonades is a village and a community of the municipal unit of Esperies, in the northern part of the island of Corfu, Greece. In 2011 its population was 392 for the village and 863 for the community, which includes the villages Kounavades, Livadi and Psathylas. Velonades is located northwest of the city of Corfu.

Population

See also
 List of settlements in the Corfu regional unit

References

External links
 Velonades at the GTP Travel Pages

Populated places in Corfu (regional unit)